Pope Demetrius II of Alexandria, 111th Pope of Alexandria & Patriarch of the See of St. Mark.

He was born in the village of Galda, the governorate of El-Minya, Egypt. He became a monk in the Monastery of Saint Macarius the Great. When the abbot of the monastery departed, he was chosen to become the new abbot. He did well in managing the monastery. For his good virtues, he was ordained a Pope to succeed the great Pope Cyril IV, the 110th Patriarch.

He completed the construction of Saint Mark Cathedral, built many buildings in the patriarchate, and in his monastery in the area of Atrees. On 17 November 1869, he attended the celebration for the opening of the Suez Canal, and met many kings. He was well respected by Ottoman Sultan Abdulaziz. When this Pope came before him to greet him, the Pope kissed the sultan on his chest. The Sultan was troubled, and the guards asked the Pope why he did that. The Pope said, "The book of God says: 'The king's heart in the hand of the Lord' (Proverbs 21:1), when I kissed his heart, I have kissed the hand of God." The Sultan was pleased with his answer, and gave him many farm lands to help the poor and the schools. The Pope traveled on a governmental boat to visit the churches in Upper Egypt. He regained those who were lost and strengthened the faithful.

After he had completed in the papacy seven years, seven months, and seven days, he departed in peace on the eve of Epiphany, the 11th day of Tubah in the Coptic Calendar (January 18, 1870)

References 

General

Atiya, Aziz S. The Coptic Encyclopedia. New York: Macmillan Publishing Co., 1991.

External links 
 The Official website of the Coptic Orthodox Pope of Alexandria and Patriarch of All Africa on the Holy See of Saint Mark the Apostle
 Coptic Documents in French

Demetrius II of Alexandria
1870 deaths
Coptic Orthodox saints
Year of birth missing
People from Minya Governorate